"In a Real Love" is a song co-written and recorded by American country music singer Phil Vassar.  It was released on May 4, 2004 as the first single from the album Shaken Not Stirred.  The song reached the top of the Billboard Hot Country Singles & Tracks chart on November 6 becoming his second number one hit of his career and his first since "Just Another Day in Paradise" in 2000.  The song was written by Vassar and Craig Wiseman.

Background
Vassar discussed the song's inspiration on his website in 2004:

Chart positions

Year-end charts

References

2004 singles
Phil Vassar songs
Songs written by Craig Wiseman
Songs written by Phil Vassar
Song recordings produced by Frank Rogers (record producer)
Arista Nashville singles
2004 songs